Too Hot may refer to:
 "Too Hot" (Alanis Morissette song), 1991
 "Too Hot" (Kool & the Gang song), 1979
 "Too Hot" (Coolio song), 1995
 "Too Hot" (Jason Derulo song), 2019
 "Too Hot", a song by Prince Buster
 Too Hot, a ring name of Scott Taylor (wrestler)

See also
2 Hot, a 1978 album by Peaches & Herb